The Datia train accident was a railroad accident that occurred on 3 October 2005 involving a passenger train near Datia in India's Madhya Pradesh Province. The accident occurred just three weeks before the Veligonda rail disaster which killed 114 people.

The overcrowded Bundelkhand Express from Varanasi to Gwalior was apparently travelling at over six times the legal speed limit, when it overshot a sharp turn near the town of Datia. The engine and six coaches jumped the track and crashed through a signalman's box before coming to rest nearby in a crumpled heap. 100 people were killed and over 300 people were injured, with dozens having to be cut out of the wreckage by rescue teams. The train did not catch fire following the accident.

References

2005 disasters in India
Derailments in India
History of Madhya Pradesh (1947–present)
Disasters in Madhya Pradesh
Datia
Railway accidents in 2005
2005 in India
Rail transport in Madhya Pradesh